Lowell is an unincorporated community in Linn County, in the U.S. state of Missouri.

History
A post office called Lowell was established in 1896, and remained in operation until 1901. It is unclear why the name Lowell was applied to this community.

References

Unincorporated communities in Linn County, Missouri
Unincorporated communities in Missouri